The Wilmington and Northern Railroad is a railway company that once owned a line from Reading, Pennsylvania to Wilmington, Delaware. The original main line from Wilmington to Birdsboro, Pennsylvania was built between 1869 and 1871 by its predecessor, the Wilmington and Reading Railroad. An extension from Birdsboro to High's Junction was completed in 1874. There the Wilmington and Reading connected with the Berks County Railroad and ran over its tracks to Reading. The Berks County Railroad was foreclosed on at the end of 1874 and reorganized as the Reading and Lehigh Railroad, under the control of the Philadelphia and Reading Rail Road (the "Reading"). The Wilmington and Reading also experienced financial difficulties and was itself foreclosed on in 1876. It was reorganized in 1877 as the Wilmington and Northern. After the reorganization, the railroad was closely affiliated with the Reading, but retained its own organization and officers until 1898. In that year, the Reading bought a majority of the company's stock and incorporated it into its own system. The main line from Birdsboro to Wilmington became the Wilmington and Northern Branch, while the extension above Birdsboro was incorporated into the Reading Belt Line. The Wilmington and Northern continued to exist as a paper railroad within the Reading system. The portion of the Wilmington and Northern north of Modena, Pennsylvania was sold to Conrail at its formation in 1976. The line south of Modena was retained by the Wilmington and Northern, which leased and then sold it piecemeal to other railroads between 1981 and 2005. , the Wilmington and Northern still survived as a subsidiary of Reading International, Inc.

First predecessors and construction
The first predecessor of the Wilmington and Northern to be organized was the Wilmington and Brandywine Railroad, chartered in Delaware on March 5, 1861. It was to build from the Christina River at or near Wilmington to the state line in the direction of Parkesburg, Pennsylvania, with the power to consolidate with a connecting railroad in Pennsylvania from Parkesburg, Coatesville, or Downingtown. The Berks and Chester Railroad was incorporated on April 20, 1864, and was authorized to build from Birdsboro (in Berks County, Pennsylvania) to a connection with any railroad in Chester County, Pennsylvania. On 5 February 1865, the Wilmington and Brandywine changed its name to the Delaware and Pennsylvania State Line Railroad. A charter supplement on March 13, 1866, allowed the Berks and Chester to connect to and merge with the Delaware and Pennsylvania State Line. The two were consolidated as the Wilmington and Reading Railroad on May 29, 1866. The directors of the consolidated company were Edward and George Brooke, Hiester Clymer, L. Heber Smith, Hugh E. Steele, Charles E. Pennock, Charles Huston, Joseph Tatnall, Edward Betts, Joshua T. Heald, Francis Barry, James Bradford, and William S. Hilles. The first seven were ironmasters in Berks and northern Chester County, owning works along or near the proposed railroad, while the latter six were Wilmington businessmen. In addition to the industries along its route, supporters of the Wilmington and Reading anticipated that it would carry both anthracite and bituminous coal shipments furnished by the Reading, both to reach new markets along its line and to ship by water from Wilmington (relieving congestion at the Reading's Port Richmond docks).

Surveys for the line were carried out in the summer of 1866, between Wilmington and Elverson, Pennsylvania (then known as Springfield). Three routes were examined between Wilmington and the West Branch Brandywine Creek near the mouth of Buck Run (the site of Steele's Laurel Iron Works); the railroad's charter restrictions forced them to avoid the Brandywine in the vicinity of Hagley Yards. The first route ran from Wilmington over the hills to the northwest, dropping into the valley of the Brandywine at Twaddell's Ford, ten miles above the city. The second route was surveyed up the Red Clay Creek via Marshallton, Delaware, Kennett Square and Unioniville, and the third even further west by way of Avondale. The first route was ultimately adopted by the company. From there it was to pass up the West Branch to Coatesville, cross into the watershed of the East Branch near Isabella Furnace, and then run via Elverson and down the valley of  Hay Creek to Birdsboro, crossing the Schuylkill River to connect with the Reading. Branches were projected to Downingtown and West Chester to connect with the Chester Valley Railroad and the West Chester and Philadelphia Railroad but were never built.

The railroad's board was slightly rearranged at the annual meeting of the stockholders in March 1867. George Brooke, Smith, and Bradford left the board, and were replaced by Sheshbazzar B. Worth, another Coatesville ironmaster, and Victor and Irenee du Pont, of the gunpowder-making du Pont family. At the subsequent directors' meeting, Edward Brooke was chosen president, while Hilles was chosen secretary and treasurer. The company also obtained a charter supplement on February 25, 1867, allowing them to extend their rail line from the Christina to the Delaware River and build wharves and piers. Brooke was replaced as president by Steele in January 1868; Heald and Barry left the board to be replaced by two other Wilmingtonians, Evan C. Stotsenburg and Charles Warner.

The first revenue movement over the new railroad was a freight train from Coatesville south to Embreeville, Pennsylvania on July 28, 1869. Passenger service was inaugurated with a special train from Coatesville to Wilmington on December 24, 1869. In the following year, construction continued north along the West Branch to Hibernia, site of an iron furnace, and on to Birdsboro and the Reading connection. The line to Birdsboro was opened for service on June 22, 1870.

Berks County extension and bankruptcy
The railroad's terminus at Birdsboro, some distance below Reading, Pennsylvania on the Schuylkill, made it dependent entirely on the Philadelphia and Reading for coal traffic. The Reading's efforts to control shipment of coal from the Schuylkill coalfields were resented by many in the region, and while the Wilmington and Reading was still in construction, observers noted that extending it to Pottsville or other points in the coal region would free it from dependence on the Reading and provide an independent outlet for the region's coal. The Manufacturers and Consumers Anthracite Railroad, a paper railroad chartered in 1866, was suggested as a vehicle for such an extension. In 1870, Asa Packer, president of the Lehigh Valley Railroad, proposed a similar project to build a rail line from the Lehigh Valley at Slatington, Pennsylvania around or through Reading to a connection with the Wilmington and Reading. The proposed line was chartered in 1871 as the Berks County Railroad. Several of the Wilmington and Reading directors were on the board, and the new railroad was looked upon as essentially an extension of the Wilmington and Reading. The junction point between the two railroads was ultimately set at High's Junction or Poplar Neck (later Cumru Junction), along the Schuylkill just below Reading, and the Wilmington and Reading began constructing a branch from Birdsboro to that point in 1874.

The adventure proved to be a disastrous one for the company. Franklin B. Gowen, the aggressive president of the Reading, fiercely resisted the construction of the Berks County Railroad, and was rumored to have threatened to embargo the Lehigh Valley's coal trade if it cooperated with the venture. The Panic of 1873 ushered in a long depression that badly eroded the financial position of the railroads and of the Wilmington and Reading's directors. The Berks County Railroad was the first to fall; it was foreclosed in late 1874 and was reorganized as the Reading and Lehigh Railroad, under the presidency of the Reading's counsel, George F. Baer. The Wilmington and Reading attempted to assert its rights to operate the Reading and Lehigh under lease, but was unsuccessful; its rolling stock was ejected from the Reading and Lehigh north of Court Street, Reading, and the Reading and Lehigh was leased to the Reading on March 11, 1875.

Collapse soon followed for the Wilmington and Reading, which failed to make an interest payment on its bonds on April 1, 1875. Various expedients were looked to in the hopes of saving the railroad. In 1874, the South Mountain Railroad had announced its intention of building a branch to Reading, and hope was expressed that the Pennsylvania Railroad might lease the Wilmington and Reading and direct traffic via that branch. While the Pennsylvania had been interested in the South Mountain as a route for coal to New England, it lost interest after the Panic and that railroad was never opened. Anticipating that the satisfaction of the bondholders' claims would leave nothing for the stockholders, the directors entered into negotiations with W. O. Leslie, a Philadelphia railroad promoter. Leslie was the president of the Baltimore, Philadelphia and New York Railroad, which enjoyed very broad charter rights in Pennsylvania and Maryland, but had little else to show in the way of assets except for a bit of grading near Towsontown, Maryland. Contemporary newspapers speculated that Leslie was secretly backed by the Baltimore and Ohio Railroad, but this was not the case. Almost all of the stock was issued to Leslie (who never paid in his subscription on it). The two companies agreed to merge on May 31, 1875, but no particular change occurred in the running of the railroad, which defaulted on its mortgage later in the year and was placed in the hands of commissioners to operate. The vague hopes entertained that the Baltimore and Ohio would  invest in the Baltimore, Philadelphia and New York, or that its bonds could be readily placed in London, restoring some investment to the stockholders, failed to materialize.

Reorganization
The bulk of the Wilmington and Reading was sold under foreclosure on December 4, 1876. The branch from Birdsboro to Reading was sold under a separate mortgage. Due to differences in state law on mortgages, the line in Pennsylvania was reorganized as the Wilmington and Northern Railroad (of Pennsylvania) on February 5, 1877, while the portion in Delaware was reorganized as the Wilmington and Northern Railroad (of Delaware) on February 22, 1877. These two were consolidated on April 3, 1877 under Pennsylvania law as the Wilmington and Northern Railroad. The first annual meeting of the new company was held on May 7, 1877. Robert Frazer, Matthew Baird, Edward S. Buckley, Lammot du Pont, Charles Baber, George Brooke, and Daniel R. Bennett were chosen as directors.  Frazer was elected president, while Peter S. Ermold was appointed secretary and treasurer and J. M. Thompson engineer and general superintendent. At the close of 1877, the railroad owned 11 engines, 11 passenger and baggage cars, and an unspecified number of freight cars. While the depressed economic conditions limited the railroad's ability to put its physical plant in good order, a new connection was built to the Pennsylvania Railroad at Coatesville, a new station was built at Second and Cherry Streets in Reading (reached via the Reading and Lehigh), and arrangements were made to use the Philadelphia, Wilmington and Baltimore Railroad's station in Wilmington as the main passenger station there.

Frazer and du Pont both resigned from the board in 1878. Frazer was succeeded as president by Bennett and as a director by L. Taylor Dickson, while Lammot was replaced by his first cousin Henry A. du Pont. The railroad made a considerable investment that year in filling in and replacing some of its bridges and replacing worn out rails. A high trestle at Dupont Station blew down in a storm on October 23 and had to be rebuilt. Further rearrangement occurred in the following year. Bennett resigned as president and director and was succeeded by du Pont, who would hold that office for the remainder of the railroad's independent operation. Buckley also resigned from the board; they were replaced by L. Waln Smith and Charles Huston, the latter an original Wilmington and Reading director. During this year, the railroad sold bonds to finance the construction of two new branches. The railroad also faced complications at the northern end of the line. The Reading and Lehigh was independently owned, but leased to the Philadelphia and Reading. It was sold at foreclosure on September 23, 1879, terminating the Wilmington and Northern's agreement with it for trackage rights from High's Junction to Reading. By now, the Wilmington and Northern had abandoned ambitions of challenging the Philadelphia and Reading, and agreed not to bid against the latter at the foreclosure sale in return for perpetual trackage rights between Birdsboro and Reading over either the Reading and Lehigh or the Philadelphia and Reading. Business on the railroad had begun to increase, and additional freight cars were rebuilt and new passing sidings laid to facilitate the increased traffic.

Baird left the board in 1880 and was replaced by Antoine L. Foster, du Pont's brother-in-law. The French Creek and Rockland branches went into service in May and June of 1880, respectively, and were deemed satisfactory in increasing business on the railroad. In 1881, a wye was built at St Peters to allow engines to be turned around when they reached the end of the branch. The railroad also prepared to extend its line in Wilmington to the Delaware River and began selling mortgage bonds for the extension. The grading of the Delaware River Extension began at the end of July. Rails were laid  from the junction with the main line to the Christiana River, where an iron drawbridge was to be constructed; grading continued on the other side. To capture additional industrial traffic from South Wilmington (between the two rivers), the company also built a branch of  along Christiana Avenue to serve the Old Ferry Rolling Mills and several other industries. The Christiana Avenue Branch was finished in October 1882, and the Delaware River Extension and its wharf on the Delaware were finished in December. Another set of bonds was approved in July 1883 to construct another branches: the Kentmere Branch, leaving the main line near Silverbrook, Delaware and curving eastward to Kentmere, on the Brandywine Creek just north of the Wilmington city limits. The Wilmington and Northern also made a 999-year lease of right-of-way to the Pennsylvania Schuylkill Valley Railroad, allowing the latter to construct a parallel line along the Reading Branch from Birdsboro to Naomi, near High's Junction. This revenue was applied to the construction of a  line, the South Walnut Street Branch, projecting from the Delaware Extension in South Wilmington, and of the Water Street Branch, an extension along the south side of the Philadelphia, Wilmington and Baltimore Railroad as far as French Street, reaching industries along the Christiana waterfront.

References

Companies affiliated with the Reading Company
Defunct Delaware railroads
Defunct Pennsylvania railroads
Railway companies established in 1877